Mynydd Carn-y-cefn is the name given to the broad ridge of high ground between the Ebbw Vale and the valley of the Ebbw Fach in the Valleys region of South Wales. It lies within the unitary area of Blaenau Gwent, formerly Monmouthshire.
 
It is a Marilyn with a prominence of 176 metres.

Geology
The entire hill is composed of sandstones and mudstones dating from the Carboniferous Period. There are also numerous coal seams within the sequence, most of which have been worked. The upper part of the hill including the summit plateau is formed from the Pennant Sandstone, a rock assigned to the Carboniferous Upper Coal Measures.
The flanks of the hill owe their steepness in part to the action of glacial ice during the succession of ice ages.

There are also 3 other hills surrounding Mynydd Carn-y-Cefn which are Coity Mountain and Mulfran. You can also see Pen y Fan from the summit.
There are numerous landslips on the flanks of the ridge, notably above Blaina.

Access
A minor public road runs along the western edge of the plateau. Most of the ridge has been mapped as open country under the CRoW Act thus giving a right of access to walkers. There are a number of public footpaths and other public rights of way across and along the ridge.

References

Marilyns of Wales
Mountains and hills of Blaenau Gwent